Pearl Palace (Romanized: kakh-e Morvarid / Kāx-e Morvārid ), also known as Shams Palace (Romanized: kakh-e Shams / Kāx-e Šams) is an estate in Iran, designed by Taliesin Associated Architects (Frank Lloyd Wright Foundation) on instructions from princess Shams Pahlavi, elder sister of Mohammad Reza Pahlavi, the last Shah of Iran. It was built in the early 1970s and is located in the Mehrshahr neighborhood, in Karaj City, Iran.

Background

The Taliesin Associated Architects (Frank Lloyd Wright Foundation) had three buildings built in Iran which include the Damavand Higher Educational Institute (presently known as Payam-e Nour University's Tehran campus), the summer residence of Shams known as Mehrafarin Palace in Chalus (presently occupied by the local police), and the most prestigious, the Pearl Palace.

The Taliesin Associated Architects, William Wesley Peters, Amery-Kamooneh-Khosravi Consulting Architects of Tehran all served as architects for the project and Thomas Casey served as the civil engineer. The interior design and furniture was designed by John deKoven Hill and Cornelia Brierly. The landscape design was done by Francis Nemtin.

The palace was built on roughly 420 acres of rolling hills and featured an artificial lake. The building is around 16,145 sq ft and made of concrete, with two main domes and a "ziggurat" style structure, all connected by stairs and a large ramp. Throughout the structure circular patterns are highlighted. The building space included an office, living room, family dining room, a swimming pool, a cinema, a "rare bird hall", and bedrooms.

After the revolution 
After the Iranian Revolution, the Mostazafan Foundation seized all assets owned by the royal family, including Shams Palace. The majority of the complex was occupied by a local Baseej unit who are neglecting its upkeep. The building was recognized as a cultural heritage only in 2002, and registered by the Ministry of Cultural Heritage, Handicrafts and Tourism (Iran's Cultural Heritage, Handicrafts and Tourism Organization), who took control of portions of the building due to its historical significance. Small parts were opened to the public (in 2015) as a result of pressure from the Ministry of Cultural Heritage, Handicrafts and Tourism.

It is currently in need of repairs; in November 2020, the building was scheduled to undergo rehabilitation work. The restoration was estimated to cost $8–$13 million (300–500 billion rials) in 2017.

See also
Persian architecture
Cultural Heritage Organization of Iran

References

External links

1966 establishments in Iran
Residential buildings completed in 1966
Palaces in Iran
Royal residences in Iran
Architecture in Iran
Buildings and structures in Alborz Province